Aziz Bouhaddouz (born 30 March 1987) is a Moroccan professional footballer who plays as a striker for MSV Duisburg.

Early life
Bouhaddouz was born in Berkane, Morocco. When he was one year old, his family moved to Dietzenbach in South Hessen, Germany.

Club career
Bouhaddouz started his career at FC Dietzenbach. Following a spell at SpVgg Neu-Isenburg, he joined FSV Frankfurt in 2006 who were playing in the Oberliga Hessen at the time. In February 2009, he went on a 1.5-year loan to FC Erzgebirge Aue.

In 2011, Bouhaddouz joined SV Wehen Wiesbaden on a free transfer. He scored his first goal for the club in against VfL Osnabrück when he was also sent off. In summer 2012, he agreed to the termination of his contract which was due to end in 2013.

In September 2013, Bouhaddouz moved to the Bayer Leverkusen reserves after being released from his contract with Viktoria Köln. He scored 24 goals in 27 matches in the fourth-tier Regionalliga West.

On 5 May 2014, he signed a two-year contract with SV Sandhausen.

In April 2016, Bouhaddouz agreed to a three-year contract with FC St. Pauli. In his first season there, he amassed 15 goals and 6 assists in the league. Over two seasons at the club he scored 19 goals while assisting 8 in 54 league appearances.

In August 2018, he moved to Saudi Arabian side Al Batin. The transfer fee was undisclosed.

On 1 February 2021, the last day of the 2020–21 winter transfer window, Bouhadddouz left 2. Bundesliga club SV Sandhausen for 3. Liga side MSV Duisburg. After the season, he extended his contract until 2023.

International career
Bouhadddouz was born in Morocco, but raised in Germany and was eligible for both national teams. He made his debut for the senior Morocco national team in a friendly 0–0 tie with Albania in August 2016. A month later, he scored his first goal for his country, netting in a 2017 Africa Cup of Nations qualification match against São Tomé and Príncipe.

In May 2018 he was named in Morocco's 23-man squad for the 2018 FIFA World Cup in Russia. He scored an own goal in the first match against Iran which resulted in a loss for Morocco.

Career statistics

Club

International

Scores and results list Morocco's goal tally first, score column indicates score after each Bouhaddouz goal.

References

External links

1987 births
Living people
Moroccan footballers
Morocco international footballers
German footballers
Association football forwards
German people of Moroccan descent
Moroccan emigrants to Germany
Expatriate footballers in Germany
Moroccan expatriate sportspeople in Germany
Expatriate footballers in Saudi Arabia
Moroccan expatriate sportspeople in Saudi Arabia
FC Viktoria Köln players
SV Wehen Wiesbaden players
FC Erzgebirge Aue players
FSV Frankfurt players
SV Sandhausen players
Bayer 04 Leverkusen II players
FC St. Pauli players
Al Batin FC players
MSV Duisburg players
2. Bundesliga players
3. Liga players
Regionalliga players
Oberliga (football) players
Saudi Professional League players
2017 Africa Cup of Nations players
2018 FIFA World Cup players